Eric Mayes is a higher education administrator and professor, a former college football coach and American football linebacker. His research focuses on culture and cognition and leadership development.

Mayes played for the University of Michigan football team as a walk-on and was later elected co-captain of the undefeated 1997 Michigan Wolverines football team that won the Associated Press national championship.  Mayes, called Zeus by his teammates, was such a motivational and inspirational leader that after suffering a season-ending injury during the teams national championship run, his teammates handed him the Big Ten Conference championship trophy, hoisted him on their shoulders and carried him off the field after defeating Ohio State at Michigan Stadium, 20–14.  During the team's visit with Bill Clinton at the White House, Mayes shared remarks and presented the President with a Michigan jersey and made him an honorary "Michigan Man."

At the end of his playing career, Mayes enrolled in graduate school at the University of Michigan and worked with the University of Michigan football team on student-athlete development.   He also spent time working with Central Michigan University Football team in recruitment and player development while on the faculty at Johns Hopkins University.  After graduating with a Master of Science from Michigan, Mayes worked as a high school technology teacher and coach in Detroit, before earning his Ph.D. from Howard University.  He later graduated from Harvard University with a post doctorate master's degree focused on education policy and management.  After working on national policy issues in Washington, D.C., Mayes joined the faculty at Johns Hopkins University. before going into higher education administration.

References

Year of birth missing (living people)
Living people
American football linebackers
Johns Hopkins Blue Jays football coaches
Johns Hopkins University faculty
Harvard Graduate School of Education alumni
High school football coaches in Michigan
Howard University alumni
Michigan Wolverines football players
Sportspeople from Kalamazoo, Michigan
Players of American football from Michigan
African-American coaches of American football
African-American players of American football
21st-century African-American people
University of Michigan School of Education alumni